Gampsurus is an extinct genus of shrimp in the order Decapoda. It existed in Germany during the Campanian stage of the Cretaceous period. It contains a single species, Gampsurus dubius.

References

Caridea
Late Cretaceous crustaceans
Monotypic arthropod genera
Fossils of Germany
Cretaceous Germany
Late Cretaceous arthropods of Europe
Fossil taxa described in 1863
Campanian genera